The 2014–15 snooker season was a series of snooker tournaments played between 8 May 2014 and 4 May 2015. The Riga Open was the first professional snooker tournament held in Latvia. The season also saw the first professional tournament in Portugal as the Lisbon Open took place.

In November, it was announced that the World Open would not be held this season after the contract with the promoter was not renewed and a new venue was not found in time. But the intention was to bring the event back for the next season.

The structure of the World Championship was changed. The top 16 seeds still qualified automatically for the first round at the Crucible, but all non-seeded players had to start in the first of three qualifying rounds. The overall championship was increased from 128 to 144 players, with the additional places made available to former world champions and players from emerging countries.

New professional players

Countries:
 
 
 
 
 
 
 
 
 

The 2014/2015 season was made up of 128 professional players. The top 64 players from the prize money rankings after the 2014 World Championship, and the 33 players earning a two-year card the previous year automatically qualified for the season. The top eight players from the European Tour Order of Merit and top four players from the Asian Tour Order of Merit, who had not already qualified for the Main Tour, also qualified. Another three players came from the EBSA Qualifying Tour Play-Offs, and a further eight places were available through the Q School. The rest of the places on to the tour came from amateur events and national governing body nominations. All players listed below, except Hossein Vafaei received a tour card for two seasons.

IBSF World Snooker Championship winner:  Zhou Yuelong
IBSF World Under-21 Snooker Championship winner:  Lu Ning
EBSA European Snooker Championships winner:  Mitchell Mann
EBSA European Under-21 Snooker Championships winner:  Oliver Lines
ACBS Asian Snooker Championship winner:  Thor Chuan Leong

NGB nominations

European Tour Order of MeritEBSA Qualifying Tour Play-Offs

Asian Tour Order of Merit

Q School

Special dispensation

Invitational Tour Card

Calendar 
The following table outlines the results and dates for all the World Snooker Tour, World Ladies Billiards and Snooker Association, seniors and other events.

World Snooker Tour

World Ladies Billiards and Snooker Association

Seniors events

Other events

Points distribution 
2014/2015 points distribution for World Snooker Tour ranking and minor-ranking events:

Notes

References

External links
 

2014
Season 2015
Season 2014